Partido Nacional Liberal can refer to:

 National Liberal Party (El Salvador)
 National Liberal Party (Panama)